Juan David García Bacca (Pamplona, June 26, 1901 – Quito, Ecuador, August 5, 1992), was a Spanish–Venezuelan philosopher and university professor.

Garcia Bacca studied under the Claretians and became a priest in 1925. He continued his formative studies at the University of Munich, University of Zurich and the University of Paris. Yet he quit the Church during the 1930s and began to study philosophy at the University of Barcelona. In 1936 he went into exile because of his criticism of Francisco Franco, traveling first to Ecuador, where he taught at the Central University of Ecuador (1939–42) where he became a close friend with the writer Alfredo Pareja Diezcanseco, then to México, where he taught at the UNAM (1942–46) and finally establishing in Venezuela in 1946 and becoming a Venezuelan citizen in 1952. He started teaching upon his arrival at the Central University of Venezuela in 1946 until his retirement in 1971. He won the National Prize for Literature in 1978 for his life's work.

Works
De rebus metaphysice perfectis, seu de natura et supposito secundum primum totius philosophiae principium. Barcelona: Imprenta Claret, 1930.
Assaigs Moderns per a la fonamentació de les matemàtiques. Vol. I. Barcelona: Institut d'Estudis Catalans, 1933. Vol. II 1934.
Fundamentación de las matemáticas. Barcelona: 1934.
Introducció a la logística amb applicacions a la filosofía i a les matemàtiques. 2 vols. Barcelona: Institut d'Estudis Catalans (Biblioteca Filosófica, 3–4), 1934.
Lógica matemática. Vol I. Barcelona: 1934. Vol. II: 1935.
Lógica matemática. Vol. II. Barcelona: 1935.
Ensayo sobre la estructura lógico-genética de las ciencias físicas (Tesis Doctoral en Filosofía). Barcelona: Universidad Autónoma, 1935
Introducción a la lógica moderna. Barcelona: Labor, 1936.
Introducción al filosofar (Incitaciones y sugerencias). Tucumán (Argentina): Imprenta Miguel Violetto, Universidad Nacional de Tucumán, 1939.
Interpretation historique de la logique classique et moderne. París: Hermann (Actualités scientifiques), 1939.
Invitación a filosofar. Vol. I: La Forma del Conocer Filosófico. México: Fondo de Cultura Económica, 1940. Vol. II: 1942
Filosofía de las ciencias. Teoría de la relatividad. México: Editorial Séneca (Colección Árbol), 1941.
Tipos históricos del filosofar físico, desde Hesíodo hasta Kant. Tucumán (Argentina): Imprenta Miguel Violetto, Universidad Nacional de Tucumán, 1941.
Invitación a filosofar. Vol. II: El conocimiento científico. México: Fondo de Cultura Económica, 1942.
Introducción general a las Enéadas. Buenos Aires: Losada (Biblioteca Filosófica), 1942.
Sobre estética griega. México: UNAM, Imprenta Universitaria, 1943.
Filosofía en metáfora y parábolas. Introducción literaria a la filosofía. México: Editora Central, 1945, 1964.
Nueve grandes filósofos contemporáneos y sus temas. Vol. I: Bergson, Husserl, Unamuno, Heidegger, Scheler, Hartmann. Vol. II: W. James, Ortega y Gasset, Whitehead. Caracas: Imprenta Nacional, Ministerio de Educación Nacional de Venezuela, 1947. Nueva edición en 1990.
Introducción general a las Enéadas. Buenos Aires: Losada, 19482
Siete modelos de filosofar. Caracas: Universidad Central de Venezuela, 1950. 19632.
Las ideas de ser y estar; de posibilidad y realidad en la idea de hombre, según la filosofía actual. Barcelona: Laye, 1955.
Antropología filosófica contemporánea (Diez conferencias 1955). Caracas: Universidad Central de Venezuela, 1957. Edición revisada: Anthropos: Barcelona, 1982.
Gnoseología y ontología en Aristóteles. Caracas: Universidad Central, 1967. Separata de Episteme.  Anuario de Filosofía de la Facultad de Humanidades y Educación (Universidad Central de Venezuela, Caracas) nº 1 (1957): 3–68.
Elementos de Filosofía. Caracas: Universidad Central de Venezuela (Manuales Universitarios, nº 3) 19591. 19755. 19816.
Antropología y ciencia contemporáneas (Curso de diez lecciones). Caracas: Instituto Pedagógico, 1961. revised edition in Anthropos: Barcelona, 1983.
Existencialismo. Xalapa (México): Universidad Veracruzana, 1962.
Filosofía de las ciencias. La física. Caracas: Instituto Pedagógico, 1962.
Historia filosófica de la ciencia. México: Universidad Autónoma de México, 19631.
Metafísica natural estabilizada y problemática metafísica espontánea. México: Fondo de Cultura Económica, 1963.
Siete modelos de filosofar. Caracas: Universidad Central de Venezuela (Colección Avance, nº 5), 1963.
Introducción literaria a la filosofía. Caracas: Universidad Central de Venezuela, 19642.
Filosofía en metáforas y en parábolas. Introducción Literaria a la Filosofía. México: Editora Central, 19451.
Antología del pensamiento filosófico venezolano. Vols. II y III. Introducción y selección. Caracas: Ministerio de Educación, 1964.
Humanismo teórico, práctico y positivo según Marx. México: Fondo de Cultura Económica, 19651. Revised in 1974, 1980. 1982  as Presente, pasado y porvenir de Marx y del marxismo
Elementos de filosofía de las ciencias. Caracas: Universidad Central de Venezuela (Manuales universitarios, nº 1), 1967.
Invitación a filosofar según espíritu y letra de Antonio Machado. Mérida (Venezuela): Universidad de los Andes, Facultad de Humanidades y Educación, 1967. Edición revisada: Anthropos: Barcelona, 1984.
Elogio de la técnica. Caracas: Monte Avila (Colección Estudios), 1968.
Textos clásicos para la historia de las ciencias. Vol. II. Caracas: Universidad Central de Venezuela, 1968. Vol. I: 1961.
Curso sistemático de filosofía actual (Filosofía, ciencia, historia, dialéctica y sus applicaciones). Caracas: Universidad Central de Venezuela, Dirección de Cultura (Colección Humanismo y Ciencia, nº 8), 1969.
Los clásicos griegos de Miranda (Autobiografía). Caracas: Universidad Central de Venezuela, 1969.
Ensayos. Barcelona: Península (Colección Historia, Ciencia, Sociedad, nº 69), 1970.
Lecciones de historia de la filosofía. Vol. I. Caracas: Imprenta Universitaria, Universidad Central de Venezuela, 1972. Vol. II: 1973.
Lecturas de historia de la filosofía. Caracas: Síntesis Dosmil, 1972.
"Sobre el sentido de "conciencia" en la "Celestina"". Anuario de Humanitas (Universidad Autónoma de Nuevo León, Monterrey, México) nº 14 (1973): 106–117.
Ensayos y estudios. Milán: Vanni Scheiwiller, 1975.
Cosas y personas. México: Fondo de Cultura Económica, 1977.
Teoría y metateoría de la ciencia. Curso sistemático. Vol. I: Teoría de la ciencia. Caracas: Universidad Central de Venezuela, 1977.
Simón Rodriguez. Pensador para América. Caracas: Imprenta Nacional, Ministry of Information and Tourism, 1978
Elementos de Filosofía. Caracas: U.C.V., 19755. 19591.
Filosofía y teoría de la relatividad. Valencia: Cuadernos Teorema, 1979.
Antropología filosófica contemporánea (Diez conferencias 1955). Barcelona: Anthropos, 1982.
Vida, muerte, inmortalidad. Caracas: Universidad Central de Venezuela, 1983.
Antropología y ciencia contemporáneas (Curso de diez lecciones). Barcelona: Anthropos, 1983.
Tres ejercicios literario-filosóficos de dialéctica. Barcelona: Anthropos, 1983.
Teoría y metateoría de la ciencia. Vol. II. Caracas: Universidad Central de Venezuela, 1984.
Tres ejercicios literario-filosóficos de antropología. Barcelona: Anthropos, 1984.
Tres ejercicios literario-filosóficos de moral. Barcelona: Anthropos, 1984.
Infinito, transfinito, finito. Barcelona: Anthropos, 1984.
Invitación a filosofar según espíritu y letra de Antonio Machado. Barcelona: Anthropos, 1984.
Transfinitud e inmortalidad. Caracas: Josefina Bigott Edit., 1984.
Teoría y metateoría de la ciencia. Vol. II. Caracas: Biblioteca de la Universidad Central de Venezuela, 1984.
Presente, pasado y porvenir de Marx y del marxismo. México: Fondo de Cultura Económica, 1982.
Parménides (s. V a.C.)-Mallarmé (s. XIX d.C.) Necesidad y Azar. Barcelona: Anthropos, 1985.
Tres ejercicios literario-filosóficos de lógica y metafísica. Barcelona: Anthropos, 1986.
Qué es dios y Quién es Dios. Barcelona: Anthropos, 1986.
Elogio de la técnica. Barcelona: Anthropos, 1987.
Pasado, presente y porvenir de grandes nombres. Mitología, teogonía, teología, filosofía, ciencia, técnica. Vol. I. México: Fondo de Cultura Económica, 1988.
De magia a técnica. Ensayo de teatro filosófico-literario-técnico. Barcelona: Anthropos, 1989.
Pasado, presente y porvenir de grandes nombres: Mitología, teogonía, teología, filosofía, ciencia, técnica. Vol. II. México: Fondo de Cultura Económica, 1989.
Filosofía de la música. Barcelona: Anthropos, 1990.
Sobre "el Quijote" y Don Quijote de la Mancha. Ejercicios literario-filosóficos. Barcelona-Pamplona: Coedición Anthropos-Gobierno de Navarra, 1991.
"Autobiografía "exterior"". Anthropos (Barcelona) nº 9, nueva edición (1991): 17–18.
Confesiones. Barcelona: Coedición de la Universidad Central de Venezuela-Anthropos, 2000: 115–118.
"Autobiografía intelectual". Anthropos (Barcelona) nº 9, nueva edición (1991): 18–24. Confesiones. Barcelona: Coedición de la Universidad Central de Venezuela-Anthropos, 2000: 119–137.
Sobre virtudes y vicios. Tres ejercicios literario-filosóficos. Barcelona: Anthropos, 1993.
Confesiones. Autobiografía íntima y exterior. Barcelona: Coedición Universidad Central de Venezuela-Anthropos, 2000.
Divertimentos y migajas. Ecuador: Casa de la Cultura Ecuatoriana "Benjamín Carrión", 2001.
Sobre filantropía. Tres ejercicios literario-filosóficos (filantropía divina, divino-humana, humana). Barcelona: Coedición Anthropos-Universidad Pública de Navarra-Gobierno de Navarra, 2001.
Sobre realismo. Tres ejercicios literario-filosóficos (natural, crítico, integral). (Publicado como Balance histórico desde los griegos hasta el año dos mil). Barcelona: Coedición Anthropos-Universidad Pública de Navarra-Gobierno de Navarra, 2001.
Ensayos y Estudios (Compilación y selección de Cristina García Palacios y José Rafael Revenga). Caracas: Editorial Melvin. Fundación para la Cultura Urbana, 2002.

Translations
Parménides: El poema de Parménides (Atentado de hermenéutica histórico-vital). Traducción y comentarios. México: UNAM, Imprenta Universitaria, 1942.
Platón: Obras de Platón. 3 vols. Traducción, introducción y notas. México: UNAM, 1942–1946.
Plotino: Presencia y experiencia de Dios (Selección de textos). Traducción y notas. México: Editorial Séneca (Colección El Clavo ardiendo), 1942
Plotino: Primera Enéada de Plotino. Traducción, introducción y notas. Buenos Aires: Losada, 19421.
Tres poemas primitivos de la filosofía griega. Traducción y notas. Quito: Imprenta de la Universidad, 1942.
Los presocráticos. Vol I: Jenófanes, Parménides, Empédocles. Traducción, prólogo y notas sobre edición de Diels-Kranz. México: El Colegio de México, 1943. Vol II: 1944. Caracas: Universidad Central de Venezuela, 1955 (reedición).
Plotino: Primera Enéada de Plotino (ocho primeras secciones). Traducción en El Hijo Pródigo (México) I.5 (1943): 436–440.
Euclides: Elementos de geometría (precedidos de Los fundamentos de la geometría, de David Hilbert). Traducción, introducción y notas. México: UNAM, 1944.
Heidegger, Martin: Hoelderling y la esencia de la poesía. Seguido de Esencia del fundamento. Versión, prólogo y notas. México: Editorial Séneca, 19441.
Los presocráticos. Vol. II. Refranero clásico griego, Alcmenón, Zenón, Meliso, Filolao, Anaxágoras, Diógenes de Apolonia, Leucipo, Metrodoro de Kio, Demócrito. Traducción, prólogo y notas. México: El Colegio de México, 1944. Vol. I: 1943. Caracas: U.C.V., 1955 (reedición).
Platón: Banquete. Ion. Traducción, introducciones y notas. México: UNAM (Colección de la UNAM. Edición bilingüe), 1944.
Platón: Eutifrón. Apología. Critón. Traducción, introducciones y notas. México: UNAM (Colección de la UNAM. Edición bilingüe), 19441. 19652.
Aristóteles: Poética. Traducción, introducción y notas. México: UNAM, 19451. Caracas: UCV, 19702. 19783.
Jenofonte: Memorables (Recuerdos socráticos). Traducción, prólogo y notas. México: Secretaría de Educación Pública (Biblioteca Enciclopédica Popular nº 67), 1945.
Platón: Hipias mayor. Fedro. Traducción, introducción y notas. México: UNAM (Colección de la UNAM. Edición bilingüe), 1945.
Tucídides: Guerra del Peloponeso. Traducción, selección y notas. México: Secretaría de Educ. Pública (Biblioteca enciclopédica popular nº 76), 1945.
Jenofonte: Recuerdos de Sócrates. Banquete. Apología. Traducción, introducciones y notas. México: UNAM, 1946
Plotino: Primera Enéada de Plotino. Traducción y notas. Buenos Aires: Losada, 19482.
Jenofonte: Socráticas. Ciropedia. Economía. Traducción y estudio preliminar. Buenos Aires: W.M. Jackson (Clásicos Jackson vol. XXIII), 19491. 19522.
Heidegger, M.: Doctrina de la verdad, según Platón y Carta sobre el humanismo. Cotraducción con A. Wagner de Reyna. Santiago de Chile: Universidad de Chile (Colección Tradición y Tarea), 1953.
Antología del pensamiento filosófico venezolano. Vol. I: Siglos XVII-XVIII. Traducción del latín, introducción sistemática, prólogos históricos y selección de textos. Caracas: Ministerio de Educación. Dirección de Cultura y Bellas Artes, 1954. Vol. II: Siglos XVIII: Suárez y Urbina, 1964. Vol. III: Siglo XIX: Andrés Bello, 1964.
La Doctrina de la Justa Guerra contra los Indios en Venezuela (Tres documentos inéditos del Archivo del Palacio Arzobispal de Caracas). Traducción de las notas Latinas. Caracas: Universidad Central de Venezuela, 1954.
Alfonso Briceño: Disputaciones metafísicas (1638). Traducción del original Latino e introducción. Caracas: Universidad Central de Venezuela, 1955.
Antología del pensamiento filosófico de Colombia (de 1647 a 1761). Selección de manuscritos, textos, traducción del latín e introducción. Bogotá: Imprenta Nacional (Biblioteca de la Presidencia de Colombia, nº 21), 1955.
Fragmentos filosóficos de los presocráticos. Traducción y selección. Caracas: Universidad Central de Venezuela, 1955 (reedición de la obra de 1943–1944).
Heidegger, M.: Hölderlin y la esencia de la poesía. Traducción. Revista Nacional de Cultura (Caracas) nº 109 (1955): 163–174.
Filosofía y teoría de la relatividad. Quito: Casa de la Cultura Ecuatoriana, 1956. Valencia: Cuadernos Teorema, 1979.
Textos clásicos para la historia de las ciencias. Vol I. Caracas: Universidad Central de Venezuela, 1961. Vol. II: 1968.
Refranero, poemas, sentenciario de los primeros filósofos griegos. Selección, traducción e introducción. Caracas: Editorial Mediterráneo, 19622.
Fragmentos filosóficos de los presocráticos. Traducción y selección. Caracas: Ministerio de Educación, 1963.
Heidegger, M.: Hoelderlin y la esencia de la poesía. Traducción y comentarios. Mérida (Venezuela): Universidad de los Andes, 1968.
Platón: Sobre la Belleza y el amor (Fedro, Banquete, Hipias). Traducción. Caracas-Madrid: Editorial Mediterráneo, 19681. 1972.
Aristóteles: Poética. Versión directa, introducción y notas. Caracas: Universidad Central de Venezuela (Colección Temas), 19702. México: UNAM, 19451.
Refranero, poemas, sentenciario de los primeros filósofos griegos. Selección, traducción e introducción. Caracas-Madrid: Editorial Mediterráneo, 19723. 19591.
Marx, Karl: Differencia entre la filosofía de la naturaleza según Demócrito y Epicuro (Tesis doctoral). Traducción. Caracas: Universidad Central de Venezuela, 1973.
Tomás de Aquino: Del ente y de la esencia. Comentarios por Fr. Tomás Cayetano, OP. Traducción. Caracas: U.C.V. (Colección Filosófica, nº 5), 1974.
Aristóteles: Poética. Traducción, introducción y notas. Caracas: U.C.V., 19783. México: UNAM, 19451.
Scholtz, H.: La axiomática de los antiguos. Traducción y prólogo. Caracas: Universidad Central de Venezuela (Colección Las Ciencias, nº 6), 1978.
Platón: Obras Completas. Traducción, prólogo, notas y clave hermenéutica. Caracas: Coedición de la Presidencia de la República y la Universidad Central de Venezuela, 1980–82.
Heidegger, Martin: Hölderlin y la esencia de la poesía. Traducción, comentarios y prólogo. Barcelona: Anthropos, 19893.
Kant: Dissertaciones Latinas de Kant. Traducción. Caracas: Universidad Central de Venezuela (Colección Avance, nº 39), 1974
Hegel, G.W.F.: Scripta Latina minora. Dos discursos Latinos. Traducción. Cultura Universitaria (Caracas) nº 100 (1973): 109–125.

References

External links
Juan David García Bacca Foundation
Juan David García Bacca Research Seminar at the CESBOR-IFC (CSIC)
International Network for Garcia Bacca Studies (RIEGB)

1901 births
1992 deaths
Ludwig Maximilian University of Munich alumni
University of Zurich alumni
University of Paris alumni
University of Barcelona alumni
Academic staff of the Central University of Ecuador
Academic staff of the National Autonomous University of Mexico
Academic staff of the Central University of Venezuela
People from Pamplona
Spanish expatriates in Ecuador
Spanish expatriates in Mexico
Spanish emigrants to Venezuela
Venezuelan philosophers
20th-century Spanish philosophers
Spanish expatriates in France
Spanish expatriates in Switzerland
Spanish expatriates in Germany